Ann Copeland is the pen name of Virginia Walsh Furtwangler (born December 16, 1932), an American-Canadian writer. She was a shortlisted nominee for the Governor General's Award for English-language fiction at the 1989 Governor General's Awards for her short story collection The Golden Thread.

Biography
Born and raised in Hartford, Connecticut, she was educated at the Catholic University of America and Cornell University. She married Albert Furtwangler in 1968, and moved to Sackville, New Brunswick, where Albert taught at Mount Allison University.

She has published five short story collections and an instructional guide to writing fiction.

She returned to the United States in 1996, and is currently a professor emeritus at Willamette University in Salem, Oregon.

Selected works
At Peace (1978)
The Back Room (1979)
Earthen Vessels (1984)
The Golden Thread (1989)
Strange Bodies on a Stranger Shore (1994)
The ABCs of Writing Fiction (1996)
Season of Apples (1996)

Awards and honors
 Shortlisted nominee for the Governor General's Award for English-language fiction at the 1989 Governor General's Awards

References

1932 births
Living people
American women short story writers
Canadian women short story writers
20th-century Canadian short story writers
Cornell University alumni
Writers from New Brunswick
Writers from Hartford, Connecticut
20th-century Canadian women writers
20th-century American short story writers
20th-century American women writers
21st-century American women